New Coundon is a small village in County Durham, in England. It is situated to the west of Coundon, near Bishop Auckland. In the 2001 census New Coundon had a population of 41.

References

Villages in County Durham